, is an anime and video game illustrator and character designer from Okayama Prefecture.

Biography

Well known for sparking the popularity of the mecha musume boom within the 2000s, Fumikane was involved in various dōjin activities as one of the creators of military hardware girls. Various illustrations were featured in various commercial hobbyist magazines during this time, and his designs have been used in figurines by Toranoana and Konami. Later, he became involved in the character design for various military-themed anime television series and video games.

In July 2013, Fumikane was responsible for designing military recruitment posters and other promotional material for the Japan Self-Defense Forces.

Art style

Fumikane's works are well known for their unique mechanical girl design, which involve girls dressed in the armour of various mechanical systems. He is also able to draw detailed illustrations of weapons based on his knowledge of the mechanics of military weapons, and is not limited to drawing female characters.

Main works

Anime
Sky Girls (2006-2007): Conceptual mechanical design, Original character design
Strike Witches (2007-present): Original character design
Busou Shinki (2011-2012)
Girls und Panzer (2012-present): character design
Kantai Collection (2015)
Frame Arms Girl (2017-2019)
Gundam Build Divers Re:Rise (2019): Mobile Doll May design
Alice Gear Aegis (2023)

Videogames
Hayate the Combat Butler: Nightmare Paradise: mechanical design
Busou Shinki video games (2006-present)
Dariusburst (2009): character design
Kantai Collection (2013-present): character design and in-game sprite illustrations
Alice Gear Aegis (2018-present)
Sakura Wars (2019): guest character design for the Berlin Combat Revue (Elise and Margarethe)
Strike Witches (2020-present): character design
Fate/Grand Order (2021): Galatea Design

Commercial magazines
MC Akushizu
Spiegel Series

Figures and Model Kits
Mecha musume: character design
Busou Shinki: character design
Frame Arms Girl: character design
Megami Device: character design

Dōjinshi

: illustrations

Artbooks
『島田フミカネ ART WORKS』, published by Kadokawa Group Publishing. .

Other

Tsukuyomi: Moon Phase

References

External links

Fumikane Shimada on Twitter

1974 births
Video game artists
Japanese video game designers
Anime character designers
People from Okayama Prefecture
Living people